Acanthopagrus taiwanensis is a fish native the waters around Taiwan. It was described in 2006, when it was recognised as distinct from Acanthopagrus berda.

References

Acanthopagrus
Fish of Taiwan
Taxa named by Yukio Iwatsuki
Taxa named by Kent E. Carpenter
Fish described in 2006